This is a list of mayors of Ankara, Turkey in the Republican era.

Governors as mayors (1924–1960)
 1 Mehmet Ali Bey (1924–1924)
 2 Ali Haydar Bey (1924–1926)
 3 Asaf Bey (1926–1928)
 4 Nevzat Tandoğan (1929–1946)
 5 O. Sabri Adal (1946–1946)
 6 İzzettin Çağpar (1946–1948) 
 7 Ragıp Tüzün (1948–1950)
 8 Fuat Börekçi (1950)
 9 Atıf Benderlioğlu (1950–1954)
 10 Kemal Aygün (1954–1955)
 11 Cemal Göktan (1955)
 12 Orhan Eren (1955–1957)
 13 Kemal Aygün (1957–1958)
 14 Dilaver Argun (1958–1960)

Military rule (1960–1963)
After the coup d'état on May 27, 1960, the military appointed mayors until 1963.

 15 İrfan Baştuğ (1960)
 16 İhsan Orgun (1960–1961)
 17 Nuri Teoman (1961–1962)
 18 Enver Kuray (1962–1963)

Elected mayors (1963–1980)
The municipality act of July 27, 1963, enabled the election of the mayor. The polls held on November 17, 1963, were the first regional elections to elect the mayor.

 19 Halil Sezai Erkut (1963–1968)
 20 Ekrem Barlas (1968–1973)
 21 Vedat Dalokay (1973–1977) (CHP)
 22 Ali Dinçer (1977–1980) (CHP)

Military rule (1980–1984)
After the coup d'état on September 12, 1980, the military appointed mayors until 1984.

With the act of December 4, 1981, the municipality of some big cities in Turkey was reorganized to meet the changed requirements.

 23 Süleyman Önder (September 15, 1980 – March 30, 1984) (appointed)

Ankara Metropolitan Municipality (1984–present)
On March 8, 1984, the metropolitan municipality act was put into force.

References

mayors
 
Ankara